Kraljevečki Novaki is a former village that has been recorded as part of Sesvete, Croatia since 1991. The last census that recorded its population as a standalone settlement was in 1981, when it had 632 inhabitants.

It is connected by the D3 highway at the A4 interchange.

References

Former populated places in Croatia